Conservatism in India refers to the political philosophy which seeks to promote preservation of certain traditional values that are cherished and have developed in the subcontinent of India.

Pre-independence
A number of political parties with conservative ideologies existed in India prior to independence. These included the Congress Nationalist Party, the Punjab Unionist Party the Hindu Mahasabha and the Akali Dal.

In addition, a number of figures within the Indian National Congress, such as Sardar Vallabhai Patel were conservative.

In contrast to secular parties, such as the Punjab Unionist Party, Islamic conservatism was used by the All India Muslim League to pursue their objective of a separate Islamic state. (see Conservatism in Pakistan)

Post Independence

The first conservative party to espouse liberal economic ideals in India since independence was the Swatantra Party. It is a classical liberal party as its principles are based on individual freedom, market-based economy and limited government. It existed from 1959 to 1974. It was founded by C. Rajagopalachari in reaction to what he felt was the Jawaharlal Nehru-dominated Indian National Congress's increasingly socialist and statist outlook. Swatantra (Freedom) stood for a market-based economy with the "Licence Raj" dismantled, although it opposed laissez-faire policies. The party was thus favored by some traders and industrialists, but at the state-level its leadership was dominated by the traditional privileged classes such as zamindars (feudal landlords) and erstwhile princes.

List of current conservative parties

Hindu Mahasabha
SAD (Punjab)
IUML (Kerala)
Shiv Sena (Uddhav Balasaheb Thackeray)(Maharashtra)
Balasahebanchi Shiv Sena
(Maharashtra)
BJP
AIMIM

See also 
Liberalism in India
Socialism in India
Indian nationalism
Hindu nationalism

References

 
Political movements in India